Of Ice and Men may refer to:

 "Of Ice and Men" (American Dad!), a 2006 television episode
 "Of Ice and Men" (Roseanne), a 1992 television episode
 Of Ice and Men, a 1982 book about the British Antarctic Survey, by Vivian Fuchs
 Of Ice and Men, a 2011 British television documentary with commentary by Huw Lewis-Jones
 "Of Ice and Men", a scientific essay by Isaac Asimov included in his 1978 collection Quasar, Quasar, Burning Bright